Every Other Week (Swedish: Varannan vecka) is a Swedish comedy/drama film, released in 2006 and directed by Måns Herngren, Felix Herngren, Hannes Holm and Hans Ingemansson. The film also stars Måns and Felix Herngren, amongst others.

Plot 

The films is about Pontus (F. Herngren) who likes his "every other week" life. One week he is a responsible father to his daughter, and the other week when his ex-wife has his daughter, he parties all the time. Pontus bigger brother, Jens (M. Herngren), is the complete opposite. He has three children and has been happily married for 20 years. But one day, the whole marriage collapses for Jens, and he is forced to move to Pontus. Over one night, their lives change radically.

Cast 

Måns Herngren - Jens
Felix Herngren - Pontus
Cecilia Frode - Johanna
Anja Lundqvist - Maria
Anna Björk - Tessan

External links 

2006 films
Swedish comedy-drama films
Films directed by Hannes Holm
2000s Swedish-language films
2000s Swedish films
2006 comedy-drama films